Wayne Alexander is an American actor who grew up in the San Joaquin Valley in California.

Career

Theatre
He trained at the Los Angeles City College Theater Academy, then spent four years at San Francisco's American Conservatory Theater. He later worked as a fight choreographer and did stage work both in Los Angeles and New York City. In the late 1980s, he made the switch to film and TV.

Babylon 5
Alexander appeared in numerous roles on the Babylon 5 television series. His first appearance in the series was in the season two episode "Comes the Inquisitor" as "Sebastian" – the only time he played a human.  Alexander subsequently played "Lorien". Other appearances were in season three as a Narn named "G'Dan" in the episode "And the Rock Cried Out, No Hiding Place", as a Drazi in the season four episode "Intersections in Real Time", and as a Drakh in the season five episodes "Movements of Fire and Shadow" and "The Fall of Centauri Prime". In the television films, he played a Drakh in Babylon 5: A Call to Arms, and in Babylon 5: The River of Souls, he appeared as a soul.

Other appearances
On television Alexander has also guest starred on Otherworld (1985), The Twilight Zone (1986), Hypernauts (1996), Frasier (1997), Sabrina, the Teenage Witch (1998), Becker (1998), The X-Files (1998-2000), Mad Men (2013), and Scandal (2013).

In the 1990 film Spaced Invaders, Alexander portrayed Vern Pillsbury, the geekish gas station attendant who becomes the powerful "Verndroid" after coming into contact with the commander of the invading Martians.

Filmography

References

External links
 Official site
 

Year of birth missing (living people)
Living people
American male television actors
Los Angeles City College alumni